The Opel Kapitän is a luxury car made in several different generations by the German car manufacturer Opel from 1938 until 1970.

Kapitän (1938–1940)

The Kapitän was the last new Opel model to appear before the outbreak of the Second World War, developed during 1938 and launched in the spring of 1939 at the Geneva motor show. Production began in November 1938. The first Kapitän was available in many different body styles, the most popular one being the 4-door saloon. 2-door coupé cabriolets were also built. The pre-war Kapitän featured a unitary body, an innovative feature for its time; it was studied by the Soviet engineers and heavily influenced the design of the GAZ-M20 Pobeda. The Kapitän inherited its 2.5-litre engine from its predecessor: in this application a maximum speed of 118 km/h (73 mph) was reported.

Civilian automobile production by Opel ceased in the Fall / Autumn of 1940, by which time 25,371 Kapitäns had been produced: a further three were assembled during 1943, giving a total production volume for the version launched in 1939 of 25,374. In addition, 2 were assembled in 1946, and one in 1947, but these were not officially recorded in the statistics.

Included in the production total were 248 of the two-seater cabriolets built for Opel by independent coach builders Gläser of Dresden and Hebmüller of Wülfrath in Wuppertal. There would, however, be no resurrection for the cabriolet Kapitäns in 1948 when the saloon version was reintroduced.

Kapitän (1948–1950)

In October 1948, the Kapitän was reintroduced as Germany's first post-war six-cylinder automobile. It would have made sense to start building the Kapitän a year earlier, as the engine was also used in the Opel Blitz trucks at the time, but the occupation regulations prohibited civilian sales of passenger cars of over 1.5 litres displacement. Initial production was reserved for the occupying powers, but sales to private customers started in 1949. There was no sign of the wide range of coupé and cabriolet bodies that had broadened the model's appeal in the 1930s: the 1948 Kapitän was offered only as a saloon/sedan, based on the 1939 version.

The main differences from the pre-war model were round headlights as opposed to hexagonal ones, as well as improved leaf springs and dampers. From May 1950 the dashboard was redesigned and the shifter was relocated from the floor to the steering column.

Up to February 1951, 30,431 Kapitäns were built.

Kapitän (1951–1953)

The 1951 Kapitän, introduced in March 1951, was a stylistically slightly modernized version of the old model; technically it was much the same.

From the outside the car was readily distinguished from the first post-war Kapitäns, thanks to an abundance of chrome and a US style grill at the front. This was the most modern large mass-produced car in Europe during the immediate pre-and postwar years. Competitive Mercedes models with flat, upright, one piece windscreen and external headlamps seemed from another age in spite of their greater prestige value. The result was that this solidly built and comfortable car lost rapidly in value and maintenance effort, with few second-hand buyers being able to afford to tax and insure a 2.5-litre engine at the time.

From March 1951 up to July 1953, Opel built 48,562 cars of this series.

Kapitän (1953–1958)

In November 1953, Opel launched a completely new Kapitän that was longer and wider than its predecessor. Carried over was the six-cylinder engine, though its compression ratio was raised to 7.0:1, giving  initially. The ´54 featured a revised rear live axle, a rear stabilizing bar and slightly enlarged drum brakes.

Model year 1956 saw a mild facelift with a more up-to-date grille, bezeled headlamps, larger front indicator lights and revised side trim.

From May 1957, a semi-automatic three-speed overdrive transmission with an additional fourth gear became available on request.

From November 1953 to February 1958, 154,098 Kapitäns were built. In its time, this generation was the third-most popular car in Germany behind Volkswagen´s Beetle and Opel's own Rekord (Oswald, p. 73).

Kapitän P1

The 1958 Kapitän (series P1), introduced in June 1958, was both wider and lower than its predecessor, and featured panoramic windows. It won some plaudits for its American-inspired "dream-car" styling, but there were also critics who pointed out that the extent of the wrap-around front and rear windows, along with the slope of the rear roof-line, restricted the driver's view out unnecessarily and made the rear doors very narrow: many back seat passengers, once they had  negotiated their way onto the back seat had headroom issues.

Wheelbase, track widths, length and width were all slightly increased, while a flatter roof made the car some  lower.

The P1 was built only for one year. From June 1958 to June 1959, 34,282 were produced, which was fewer cars than the annualized output of either its direct predecessor or of its direct successor.

Kapitän P2 (1959–1963)

The P2 Kapitän came to market in August 1959 and while it still had the panoramic windscreen, it gained a new grille and a revised body with a more angular roof and a new rear. It was driven by a stronger new, oversquare 2.6-liter-inline six (bore x stroke: 85 x 76.5 instead of 80 x 82 mm), still of OHV and pushrod design. Carried over were the 3-speed and 4-speed overdrive transmission; the latter was replaced from December 1960 by a version of GM´s 3-speed Turbo-Hydramatic automatic.

From August 1959 to December 1963, Opel built 145,618 units of this Kapitän series. No other Opel Kapitän model, before or subsequently, achieved such a high production level.

The large Opels were never dominating players in their market segment on the same scale as the smaller Rekord and Kadett models, possibly due to the strength of Mercedes-Benz in the big car sector. Nevertheless, the highpoint for the big Opels was 1960 when together the Kapitän and Admiral were Europe's top-selling six-cylinder saloons, with nearly 48,000 sold.

Kapitän A (1964–1968)

In 1964, Opel introduced the completely new KAD (Kapitän, Admiral, Diplomat) models; the Kapitän served as the base model of this three-tier model range.

It was powered by the same engines as the contemporary Opel Admiral, namely a 2.6-L-inline six or a 2.8-L-six; a few Kapitäns even received the Chevrolet-sourced 4.6-liter V8.

Like its more expensive brethren, the Kapitän was reworked in late 1967 and received rub strips, a new ZF steering and a collapsible steering column. At the same time, a new HL (Hochleistung = high-performance) version of the 2.8-liter six became available that put out .

Sales of the Kapitän A fell sharply off; up to its discontinuation in November 1968, a total of 24,249 cars left the factory.

Kapitän B (1969–1970)

The Kapitän B was introduced in 1969 and was the last car bearing the Kapitän name. Engine options included a 1-bbl 2.8-liter inline-six or a 2-bbl version of same, coupled with a 4-speed manual or Opel's 3-speed automatic transmission.

Production ended in May 1970. The Admiral and Diplomat lived on for another seven years until they were replaced by the Senator in 1978.

Only 4,976 Kapitän B models were built in 15 months.

See also the other two "KAD" cars
Opel Admiral
Opel Diplomat

Military operators

 The British Army used the Opel Kapitän for intelligence gathering on the BRIXMIS Missions.

Sources
 Werner Oswald, Deutsche Autos 1945–1976. Motorbuch Verlag, Stuttgart 1975 edition. .
 

 Phil Seeds' Virtual Car Museum
 KAD Historie

External links

 Classic Opel Parts database

Kapitan
Cars introduced in 1938
Executive cars
Sedans
Convertibles
1940s cars
1950s cars
1960s cars
1970s cars
Cars discontinued in 1970
Luxury vehicles